Port Mitchell is an unincorporated community in York Township, Noble County, in the U.S. state of Indiana.

History
Port Mitchell was laid out in 1838.

Geography

References

Unincorporated communities in Noble County, Indiana
Unincorporated communities in Indiana